Lovin & Withers Investment House, located at 722 Beale Street in Kingman, Arizona, was built c. 1914 in the Bungalow/Craftsman style. Lovin & Withers built the house as contractors, using native stone. It closely resembles the other two houses on Pine Street. The house was a rental property during a growth period, and today, it is an office for a local lawyer. It is on the National Register of Historic Places as number 86001161.

It was evaluated for National Register listing as part of a 1985 study of 63 historic resources in Kingman that led to this and many others being listed.

References

American Craftsman architecture in Arizona
Houses completed in 1914
Houses in Kingman, Arizona
Houses on the National Register of Historic Places in Arizona
National Register of Historic Places in Kingman, Arizona